Anjireh (also Romanized as Anjīreh; also known as Anjīr) is a village in Mehran Rural District, in the Central District of Bandar Lengeh County, Hormozgan Province, Iran. At the 2006 census, its population was 894, in 140 families.

References 

Populated places in Bandar Lengeh County